Brockhampton was an American hip-hop collective. Formed in 2010, they have released eight studio albums, four compilations, one mixtape, 27 singles, and 38 music videos. Originally formed as AliveSinceForever in 2010 and after releasing a compilation and extended play under the name in 2012 and 2013 respectively, the group rebranded to Brockhampton, proclaiming themselves as "the world's greatest boy band". The collective's lineup underwent significant changes in 2014 alongside this rebrand. After releasing singles throughout 2015, the group's debut mixtape, All-American Trash, was released for free on March 24, 2016.

Throughout 2017, Brockhampton released three studio albums, collectively known as the "Saturation trilogy". The first, Saturation, was released through Question Everything, Inc. and Empire Distribution on June 9, 2017. The second album, Saturation II, was released on August 25, 2017, which debuted at number 57 on the Billboard 200, and also charted in Canada and New Zealand. The conclusion to the trilogy, Saturation III, followed on December 15, 2017, debuting at number 15 on the Billboard 200 and at number 5 on the Top R&B/Hip-Hop Albums, additionally charting in Canada. A fourth studio album, Iridescence, was released on September 21, 2018. It debuted at number one on the Billboard 200.

Albums

Studio albums

Compilation albums

Mixtapes

Extended plays

Singles

Other charted songs

Music videos

Notes

References

External links 
 
 
 
 

Brockhampton (band) albums
Discographies of American artists
Hip hop discographies